The Yamashina Botanical Research Institute (山科植物資料館) is a research botanical garden specializing in medicinal herbs, operated by Nippon Shinyaku and located at Oyakesaka no tsujicho 39, Yamashina-ku, Kyoto, Kyoto, Japan. It is open from Monday through Friday; please write ahead for permission to visit.

The institute was established in 1934. Today its garden is 8,000 m² in extent, and consists of one large and two small greenhouses, an arboretum, an herb garden, and a botany school with library and laboratories. It contains more than 3,000 species of medicinal and useful plants, including rare species of orchid, and cultivars of marijuana from around the world.

See also 
 List of botanical gardens in Japan

References 
 Yamashina Botanical Research Institute (Japanese)
 Jardins Botaniques Japonais (French)

Botanical gardens in Japan
Gardens in Kyoto Prefecture
Tourist attractions in Kyoto
Geography of Kyoto
Education in Kyoto
Buildings and structures in Kyoto